Numby Numby, also known as Nimby Nimby or Ngambingambi, is a sinkhole in the Northern Territory of Australia located in the locality of McArthur about  west-northwest of Borroloola.

Description
Surrounded by high cliffs, the water is only accessible via a washout that breaks through the North West side, providing a steep path to the water's edge. Large lily pads dominate the shallows. The depth is at least  within a short distance from the shoreline.

Legend
In the Indigenous languages of the area, Yanyuwa, Garrwa, Gudanji and Marra, the sinkhole is known as Ngambingambi. It is an important site associated with the activities of the Rainbow Serpent (Bujimala) and two newly initiated men (rduwarra wujara). The two young men had travelled from the McArthur River, just downstream from the town of Borroloola. As they traveled they began to kill flying foxes, creatures kin to the Rainbow Serpent who was dwelling underground at Ngambingambi. On arrival at Ngambingambi the Rainbow Serpent was so angry, he burst through the ground, creating the sinkhole. He then carried the two young men back to the McArthur River and downstream to the Sir Edward Pellew Islands. The two young men reside on Pearce and Urquart islands. The Rainbow Serpent is said to dwell between these two islands watching the boys.

See also 
 List of sinkholes of Australia

References

 Bradley, John; & Yanyuwa families. (1988). Yanyuwa Country: The Yanyuwa people tell the story of their Land. Greenhouse Publications.
 Bradley, John; Cameron, Nona; & Yanyuwa Families. (2002). Forget About Flinders. A Yanyuwa Atlas of the south west Gulf of Carpentaria. J.M McGregor Publishers: Queensland.

Sinkholes of Australia
Lakes of the Northern Territory